Juhan Kukk's cabinet was in office in Estonia from 21 November 1922 to 2 August 1923, when it was succeeded by Konstantin Päts' second cabinet.

Members

This cabinet's members were the following:

References

Cabinets of Estonia